Sportanlage Stapfen is a stadium in Naters, Switzerland.  It is currently used for football matches and is the home ground of FC Naters. The capacity is 3,000. The stadium was opened in 1997.

References

Football venues in Switzerland